Francis MacKenzie (born 1960) is former leader of the Nova Scotia Liberal Party.

Francis Mackenzie may also refer to:

Francis Mackenzie, 1st Baron Seaforth (1754–1815), British politician and general
Francis Wallace Mackenzie (1824–1892), member of parliament for Otago, New Zealand
Francis Mackenzie (missionary) (1833–1895), Scottish member of the Plymouth Brethren
Francis Mackenzie, 2nd Earl of Cromartie (1852–1893), British peer

See also
Frank Mackenzie Ross (1891–1971), Lieutenant Governor of British Columbia